Laeta was the second Empress consort of Gratian of the Western Roman Empire.

Family

The only relation of Laeta mentioned by Zosimus was her mother Pissamena.

Empress
Gratian was first married to Flavia Maxima Constantia, who died at only twenty-one. The Chronicon Paschale dates the arrival of Constantia's remains in Constantinople to 31 August 383. She must have died earlier in the same year but the exact date and cause of her death are unknown. As Gratian was himself assassinated on 25 August 383,  Laeta is assumed to have married him in the short period between the death of Constantia and his death.

On his account of the first siege of Rome by Alaric I, King of the Visigoths (dated to 408), Zosimus mentions that the city faced a famine. Zosimus records that "Laeta the wife of the late emperor Gratian, and her mother Pissamena, supplied great numbers with food for some time. For since they were allowed from the treasury the provisions of an imperial table, through the generosity of Theodosius, who had conferred on then, that privilege, many received the bounty of these two ladies, and obtained from their house what preserved them from famine". 

This is the only mention of Laeta in primary sources.

References

External links
Translation of the 5th Book of Zosimus, our primary source for her existence

4th-century births
5th-century deaths
Valentinianic dynasty
4th-century Roman empresses